An orexigenic, or appetite stimulant, is a drug, hormone, or compound that increases appetite and may induce hyperphagia. This can be a medication or a naturally occurring neuropeptide hormone, such as ghrelin, orexin or neuropeptide Y, which increases hunger and therefore enhances food consumption. Usually appetite enhancement is considered an undesirable side effect of certain drugs as it leads to unwanted weight gain, but sometimes it can be beneficial and a drug may be prescribed solely for this purpose, especially when the patient is suffering from severe appetite loss or muscle wasting due to cystic fibrosis, anorexia, old age, cancer or AIDS. There are several widely used drugs which can cause a boost in appetite, including tricyclic antidepressants (TCAs), tetracyclic antidepressants, natural or synthetic cannabinoids, first-generation antihistamines, most antipsychotics and many steroid hormones. In the United States, no hormone or drug has currently been approved by the FDA specifically as an orexigenic, with the exception of Dronabinol, which received approval for HIV/AIDS-induced anorexia only.

List of Orexigenics

 5-HT2C receptor antagonists/inverse agonists — mirtazapine, olanzapine, quetiapine, amitriptyline, cyproheptadine, lurasidone
 H1 receptor antagonists/inverse agonists — mirtazapine, olanzapine, quetiapine, amitriptyline, cyproheptadine, pizotifen
 Dopamine antagonists — haloperidol, chlorpromazine, olanzapine, risperidone, quetiapine
 Adrenergic antagonists:
 β blockers — propranolol, etc.
Paradoxically, β-adrenergic agonists are also listed.
Not ephedra/clenbuterol (which is an appetite suppressant), but salbutamol, flerobuterol, Zilpaterol, and related drugs.
 α2 adrenergic antagonists — mirtazapine, mianserin
 Mixed α1/β blockers — carvedilol
 α2 Adrenergic agonists — clonidine
 CB1 receptor agonists (cannabinoids — THC/dronabinol (a component of Cannabis), nabilone
 Corticosteroids — dexamethasone, prednisone, hydrocortisone
 Certain pregnene steroids — megestrol acetate, medroxyprogesterone acetate
 Anabolic steroids — oxandrolone, boldenone undecylenate, testosterone
 Other steroids such as Prednisolone
 Sulfonylurea antidiabetic drugs such as glibenclamide, chlorpropamide and tolbutamide
 Mood stabilizers such as lithium
 Some anti-epileptic drugs such as valproate, carbamazepine and gabapentin
 α2δ VDCC ligands — gabapentin, pregabalin
 Ghrelin receptor agonists such as anamorelin, GHRP-6, ibutamoren, ipamorelin, and pralmorelin
 MC4 receptor antagonists
 Insulin
 Sugars, such as fructose
 Alcohol beverages
 Benzodiazepines, such as diazepam

See also 
 Anorectic (anorexigenic)
 Anorexia
 Eating disorder
 Obesity
 Organic feeding disorder 
 Polydipsia

References

Further reading

 Agents Used as Appetite Stimulants: Drug Class; University of Utah College of Pharmacy, 2014

External links